The third season of The Great Canadian Baking Show premiered on CBC Television on September 18, 2019. Ten amateur bakers competed over eight weeks of challenges, vying for the title. The season marked the debut of Carolyn Taylor and Aurora Browne, of the Baroness von Sketch Show, as hosts and chef Kyla Kennaley as judge. French-born Canadian chef and pastry expert Bruno Feldeisen returned as judge for a third season.

The winner of the season was Nataliia Shevchenko, with Colin Asuncion and Jodi Robson as runners-up.

Bakers

Results summary

Episodes

Episode 1: Cake 
For their first signature challenge, the bakers were given two hours to create a cake in the shape of a number that was of great significance to them, making sure that the story of their number shone through in the bake. For the technical challenge, the bakers were tasked with making a strawberry roulade with an Italian buttercream in one hour and thirty minutes. For the showstopper, the bakers had three hours to create a cake inspired by any one of Canada's ten provincial flags, whether the flag of their home province or elsewhere.

Episode 2: Biscuits 
The signature bake required the making of 36 identical savoury crackers, with a complimentary spread, in 90 minutes. In the technical challenge, Kyla asked the bakers to make a dozen marshmallow puff cookies, in one hour and 20 minutes. For the showstopper they were asked to create a fantasy scene made out of cookies, using at least two different types of cookie dough, in four hours.

Episode 3: Bread 
For the signature challenge, the bakers were asked to make a povitica in two and a half hours; while maintaining its distinctive folds and swirly interior, the bakers were allowed to size, shape and flavour the loaf however they wanted. For the technical challenge, the bakers had to make twelve hand-kneaded brioche à tête, with a chocolate interior, in two hours forty-five minutes. The showstopper challenge featured the bakers creating a bread sculpture, with at least two types of yeast-leavened bread, in four and a half hours.

Episode 4: Old School 
For the signature challenge, the bakers had to make a coffee cake with a complementary streusel topping in ninety minutes. For the technical challenge, the bakers were given one hour fifteen minutes to make six crème caramel desserts. The showstopper challenge had the bakers make a slab cake to celebrate any occasion of their choosing in three and a half hours; the cake also had to have a well-piped inspirational message on top.

Episode 5: Chocolate 
For the signature challenge, the bakers had two hours to produce 24 chocolate sandwich cookies, with a filling of their choice that also had to feature chocolate as a primary flavour. This week's technical required the bakers to create a marquise de chocolat in two hours. The bakers' showstopper challenge was to create a box of eighteen chocolates of three different kinds. along with a solid chocolate centrepiece - all tied together in a common theme - in three and a half hours.

Episode 6: International
The signature bake asked the competitors to produce a Pastel de tres leches, a Latin American style sponge cake soaked in a milk mixture, in three hours. The technical challenges gave them 90 minutes to make a Kransekake, a Norwegian or Danish cone-shape tower of almond cookie rings held together with royal icing, traditionally eaten on special occasions.  The showstopper challenge was to bake and decorate an internationally inspired cheesecake in four hours.

Episode 7: Pie
The semi-finals signature bake asked the contestants to make a pie with a recognizable face on it, using any pastry and filling, sweet or savoury, in two-and-a-half hours. The technical challenge gave them 2 hours and 15 minutes to make a pithivier, a puff pastry tart, filled with frangipane and sour cherry jam.  The showstopper challenge was to bake a themed tower of at least three pies and/or tarts in four hours.

Episode 8: Finale 
For the Signature challenge the finalists had three hours to make a fraisier cake, a French strawberry cake with both mousse and sponge. The Technical Challenge was to produce a marjolaine, a dessert cake combining almond and hazelnut meringue layers with chocolate buttercream, in two and a half hours. For the final showstopper, the bakers had to prepare a pièce montée centrepiece incorporating choux pastry, cake, icing and cookies, in the shape of a recognizable landmark, in four and a half hours.

References 

3
2019 Canadian television seasons